Animotion is an American synth-pop band from Los Angeles, California, best known for the songs "Obsession", "Let Him Go", "I Engineer", and "Room to Move".

Formed in 1983 from the remnants of a retro science-fiction band called Red Zone, they signed a record deal with Mercury Records in 1984 and released four studio albums.

History

Formation and rise (1983–1986) 
Animotion was founded by four former members of Los Angeles-based band Red Zone and the lead singer of the Billy Bond band. Both Red Zone and the Billy Bond Band would play at the popular music venue Madame Wong's and knew of each other. A manager hearing Red Zone were considering breaking up suggested Billy Bond Band vocalist Bill Wadhams should look into working with them, and particularly their vocalist Astrid Plane. After demonstrating some of his original material to the group they decided to form a new band with the name "Animotion" suggested by Astrid to convey energy and motion.

The initial line-up was made up of dual lead vocalists in Wadhams & Plane, keyboardist Paul Antonelli, bassist Charles Ottavio, and drummer David "Frenchy" O'Brien, this was supplemented with guitarist Don Kirkpatrick and keyboardist Greg Smith for their 1984 self-titled debut album. Released near the end of the year, a single from this album, "Obsession", written by hit songwriter Holly Knight and noted British singer/actor Michael Des Barres (who originally cut the song themselves as "Knight and Des Barres" for the 1983 movie A Night in Heaven), became a worldwide success and the band's first US Billboard Hot 100 Top Ten single, peaking early the following year. The follow-up single from this album, "Let Him Go", also cracked the US Top 40 after being remixed to sound more like its predecessor.

Following the departures of Antonelli and O'Brien, keyboardist Greg Smith, who had played on the band's debut album, and drummer Jim Blair became official members of the band prior to the recording of the follow-up album, Strange Behavior (1986). While several singles were released from this album, its success in the US paled in comparison to the debut album, whereas the band became very famous in Germany, Austria, Switzerland and South Africa, thanks to the LP's single "I Engineer", another Holly Knight composition which was co-written with Bernie Taupin and Mike Chapman. "I Engineer" reached the Top 20 (and sometimes the Top 5) in those countries. During 1986 and 1987 Animotion toured extensively, appearing alongside such performers as Phil Collins, Depeche Mode, Eurythmics, Genesis, Howard Jones, INXS, and Simply Red.

Departures and decline (1987–1990) 
In the midst of recording their third album, Animotion went through personnel changes, as all three of the remaining founding members (Ottavio, Plane, and Wadhams) departed, along with Blair. The split was not amicable; Ottavio and Plane (who by this point were a couple, and later married) were fired from the band at the behest of the management, while Wadhams' departure was the culmination of a refusal of the record label to allow him to continue to write songs for the band (on their first album he had served as principal songwriter and, along with Kirkpatrick and Smith, had performed the same role on the second), a condition which he felt uncomfortable with. Actress/dancer/singer Cynthia Rhodes, known for her performance as the character "Penny Johnson" in the 1987 film Dirty Dancing, replaced Plane as female lead singer, and former solo artist/Device member Paul Engemann replaced Wadhams as the male lead for Animotion's second self-titled album, informally known as "Room to Move" (due to the success of this song) to distinguish it from their first LP. Incidentally, Engemann's former band, Device, had also included Holly Knight (co-writer of "Obsession"). By the time of this third album's release, only Kirkpatrick and Smith remained officially in the "band" along with Rhodes and Engemann, and a slew of session musicians contributed to the recording. The single "Room to Move", a remake of a 1988 song by the group Climie Fisher, became a radio hit in April 1989, and the band's second Top 10 hit in the US, aided by its inclusion in the movie My Stepmother Is an Alien. However, the album itself did not crack the top 100 on the charts, and Animotion broke up afterwards.

Reformation (2001–present)
Several of the original members reunited on February 8, 2001, in response to a request from Alex Hart and 94.7 NRK Radio Station in Portland, Oregon, performing for a sold-out crowd. Plane, Wadhams, Kirkpatrick, and Smith have continued to perform as Animotion since this time; with drummer Kevin Rankin joining them in 2002, and Bill's son Chris Wadhams joining as bass player in 2011. Don Kirkpatrick also plays in Rod Stewart's band. When he is unavailable, Portland, Oregon guitarist Kevin Hahn deputizes in the position. They have performed many shows with A Flock of Seagulls, Wang Chung, Berlin and the Motels in recent years.

In the summer of 2005, Ottavio made a guest appearance alongside Plane and Wadhams who appeared as Animotion in the American version of the TV show Hit Me Baby One More Time, performing their hit "Obsession" and a cover of Dirty Vegas' "Days Go By".

In 2014, Wadhams heard a remix of "Obsession" by a Colorado DJ named Joman. After reaching out to the DJ, Joman offered to remix new material from the band. Wadhams sent a recording of "Raise" and the remixed product was used to obtain a record deal with Invisible Hands Music in London. After 26 years, the band—featuring core members Plane, Wadhams, Kirkpatrick, and Smith—released a new album entitled Raise, which was released in 2016 in the UK and a month later on January 20, 2017 (as Raise Your Expectations) in the US. Joman's rendition of "Raise" along with Animotion's classic "Let Him Go" are featured on the album. A music video, directed by producer Chuck Kentis' son Noah, was made for the song "Last Time"; it features a mix of live-action and animated elements. The album cover was created by Jay Vigon, who created Animotion's original logo and the logo for Prince's film Purple Rain.

The band's original drummer, David "Frenchy" O'Brien (born May 23, 1947 in Worcester, Massachusetts), died on January 13, 2019, at age 71.

In January 2023, a US show was announced: the band will play at the Cruel World Festival in Pasadena, California on May 20, 2023.

Legacy
In 2009, Animotion was thrust into pop culture again as it was featured on VH1's Top 100 One Hit Wonders of the 80s (in spite of the fact that Animotion are not one-hit wonders, as their second single "Let Him Go" made it into the top 40 in 1985, and "Room to Move" cracked the top ten in 1989, albeit with an almost entirely different line-up). Animotion came in at No. 12 with the hit "Obsession". Both Astrid Plane and Bill Wadhams were interviewed and featured.

"Obsession" was the opening theme of the World Wrestling Federation's Saturday Night's Main Event from 1985 to 1988. It was also featured in the video game Grand Theft Auto: Vice City. "Obsession" was the opening theme for the speciality TV show Fashion Television from 1985 to 2012.

Animotion performed a cover of "Dancing in the Street" which featured in the 1985 film Girls Just Want to Have Fun.

UK based specialist reissue label Cherry Red Records re-released deluxe editions of both the Animotion (1985) and Strange Behavior (1986) albums via its Cherry Pop imprint on August 17, 2009 (UK) and a week later in the US (according to Amazon.com). Extensive sleeve notes are by long-time fan Steve Thorpe; some visual archive material for the booklets was supplied by Charles Kennedy of Invisible Hands Music. The audio was remastered by Tim Turan in Oxford UK. The CDs each include several bonus tracks including 7" remixes and 12" remixes gathered from various singles released between 1984 and 1986 in Europe and the United States.

On September 13, 2022, A24 released a teaser trailer for the upcoming Ti West film MaXXXine. The short video clip is paired with Animotion's song "Obsession."

Personnel

Members

Current members
Astrid Plane – lead vocals (1983–1988, 2001–present)
Bill Wadhams – lead vocals, guitars (1983–1988, 2001–present)
Don Kirkpatrick – lead guitars (1983–1990, 2001–present)
Greg Smith – keyboards (1985–1990, 2001–present)
Jim Blair – drums (1985–1988, 2017–present)
Chris Wadhams – bass (2011–present)
Wyatt Blair – bass/guitar (2018–present)

Touring musician
Kevin Hahn – lead guitars (2003–present; substitute for Don Kirkpatrick)

Former members
Paul Antonelli – keyboards (1983–1985)
David "Frenchy" O'Brien – drums (1983–1985; died 2019)
Charles Ottavio – bass (1983–1988; guest appearance – 2005)
Kevin Rankin – drums (2002–2016)
Paul Engemann – lead vocals (1988–1990)
Cynthia Rhodes – lead vocals (1988–1990)

Line-ups

Discography

Studio albums

+ The band's self-titled debut album was re-titled The Language of Attraction for its Canadian release (which also omitted the song "Turn Around")

Compilation albums

Singles

References

External links
 Official Website
 Bill Wadhams' Website
 Bill Wadhams Interview following Hit Me Baby One More Time appearance
 Brief Don Kirkpatrick Bio
Animotion's Genius Insanity Tour Podcast

American new wave musical groups
Musical groups established in 1983
Musical groups disestablished in 1990
Musical groups reestablished in 2001
Synth-pop new wave musical groups
Casablanca Records artists